Billy Roe (born 7 May 1957 in Indianapolis, Indiana), is a former driver in the Indy Racing League.  He raced in the 1997–1998 and 2000–2002 seasons with 16 career starts, including 2 at the Indianapolis 500. His best IRL finish was a 12th place at Nashville Speedway in 2001. In the 1997 Las Vegas Motor Speedway race, he fielded his own car. Prior to racing in the IRL he competed in Toyota Atlantic from 1991 to 1995, however, he never competed in more than 3 races in a single season. He also competed in 2 Indy Lights races in 1992. After racing in the IRL he competed in the 2003 and 2004 seasons of the Infiniti Pro Series, finishing 16th and 10th in points. Billy Roe established Indianapolis Motor Speedway's first official electric car lap record of 106.897 mph on 7 May 2011 - first lap, first time around, in the Brawner Hawk EX-11.

IRL IndyCar Series

Indy 500 results

External links
Driver Database Profile

1957 births
Living people
IndyCar Series drivers
Indianapolis 500 drivers
IndyCar Series team owners
Indy Lights drivers
Atlantic Championship drivers
Racing drivers from Indianapolis

EuroInternational drivers